Olaf Kobacki (born 10 July 2001) is a Polish professional footballer who plays as a forward for Ekstraklasa club Miedź Legnica, on loan from Arka Gdynia.

Career

As a youth player, Kobacki joined the youth academy of Polish side Lech Poznań. 

In 2021, he was sent on loan from Italian Serie A club Atalanta to Polish I liga side Arka Gdynia. On 14 August 2021, he made his debut in a 1–0 win over Stomil Olsztyn. On 18 August 2021, Kobacki scored his first 2 goals for the club in a 3–1 win over Widzew Łódź. On 29 April 2022, he joined Arka on a permanent basis, signing a three-year contract.

On 5 July 2022, Kobacki extended his contract with Arka until 2026 and joined Miedź Legnica on a one-year loan.

Honours
Individual
Ekstraklasa Young Player of the Month: September 2022

References

External links

 

2001 births
Living people
Footballers from Poznań
Polish footballers
Association football forwards
Poland youth international footballers
Ekstraklasa players
I liga players
III liga players
Atalanta B.C. players
Arka Gdynia players
Miedź Legnica players
Polish expatriate footballers
Polish expatriate sportspeople in Italy
Expatriate footballers in Italy